Peter MacGill is an American gallerist, curator, and art historian. MacGill is the former President of the Pace/MacGill Gallery, which opened in 1983 on East 57th Street in New York City and was consolidated into the Pace Gallery in 2019-20.

In 2006 he was the first recipient of the Harold Jones Distinguished Alumni Award at The University of Arizona.

Career
MacGill graduated with a B.A. from Ohio Wesleyan University in 1974 and a M.F.A. from the University of Arizona in 1977, where he was the first student to graduate from the MFA Photography program. He began working in the photography world as a college intern at Light Gallery in 1973 where he hung Stephen Shore’s first solo show. While attending the University of Arizona MacGill served as a curator at the Center for Creative Photography. In 2005 he was ranked 15th on the list of "The 100 Most Important People in Photography" compiled by American Photo magazine.

MacGill is President of the Pace/MacGill Gallery, which opened in 1983 on East 57th Street in New York City. Although Pace/MacGill specializes in photography, the gallery has also exhibited non-photographic work since the mid 1990s. In 1999 the gallery sold Man Ray's Glass Tears (1930–33) for $1.3 million, at the time the highest price ever paid for a photograph. MacGill has stated that the work sold for such a high amount because of its scarcity (only three prints were made). In 2006 MacGill set a new record when he bought Edward Steichen’s The Pond—Moonlight for $2.9 million on behalf of a private buyer.

In 2019 MacGill established a partnership with RadicalMedia to develop a streaming platform focused on the history of photography.

Publications

Publications by MacGill
Irving Penn: New and Unseen. New York: Pace/MacGill Gallery, 1999. .

Publications with contributions by MacGill
Rodchenko. Göttingen: Steidl, 2012. .
Irving Penn: Paintings. New York: Apparition, 2018. .

Awards
2005: Harold Jones Distinguished Alumni Award at The University of Arizona.

References

University of Arizona alumni
American art dealers
Living people
Year of birth missing (living people)